Operation Amla was a 48 Hours terrorist-attack drill/mockup that took place across 13 coastal districts in Tamil Nadu, India on 20 and 21 of June 2013. Operation was designed to test their emergency preparedness during terrorist infiltration. More than 300 Personnel of Tamil Nadu Police and Indian Coast Guard(Eastern Region), equipped with latest technology and devices, conducted the drill across the Eastern coast beginning from Chennai to Kanyakumari. Security had been tightened at East Coast Road, Chennai Airport and Coastal regions.

References 

Tamil Nadu Police
Emergency management in India
Indian Coast Guard
2013 in India
Law enforcement in Tamil Nadu